Five Fingers for Marseilles is a 2017 South African Neo-Western thriller film written by Sean Drummond and directed by Michael Matthews. It was screened in the Discovery section at the 2017 Toronto International Film Festival.

Cast
 Vuyo Dabula as Tau
 Zethu Dlomo as Lerato
 Hamilton Dhlamini as Sepoko
 Kenneth Nkosi as Bongani
 Mduduzi Mabaso as Luyanda
 Aubrey Poolo as Unathi
 Lizwi Vilakazi as Sizwe
 Anthony Oseyemi as Congo
 Jerry Mofokeng as Jonah
 Ntsika Tiyo as Zulu
 Kenneth Fok as Wei
 Warren Masemola as Thuto
 Garth Breytenbach as Officer De Vries
 Dean Fourie as Honest John

Reception
On review aggregator website Rotten Tomatoes, the film holds an approval rating of 80%, based on 15 reviews, and an average rating of 6.9/10.

References

External links
 
 

2017 films
2017 thriller films
2017 Western (genre) films
Films shot in the Eastern Cape
Neo-Western films
Sotho-language films
South African thriller films
Xhosa-language films